The Club Hockey Hielo Txuri Urdin Izotz Hockey Taldea ( + ), abbreviated CHH Txuri Urdin IHT, is a Basque ice hockey club based in Donostia–San Sebastián, in the Basque Country autonomous community of northeastern Spain.

Teams

Men's team 
The men's representative team was founded in 1972 as the reserve team of Real Sociedad HH, one of the six founding clubs of the Superliga Española, the predecessor of the Liga Nacional de Hockey Hielo (LNHH). They made their Superliga Española debut in the 1974–75 season.

The team plays in the LNHH, where they have won twelve Spanish Championship titles, the second-most titles won by any club in league history (after CH Jaca) and they have been the Spanish Championship runner-up seven times.

Women's team 
The women's representative team has played in the Liga Nacional de Hockey Hielo Femenino (LNHHF; also known as the Liga Iberdrola de Hockey Hielo for sponsorship reasons) since the 2014–15 season. In 2022, they claimed their first Spanish Championship title as league champions and also won their first Copa de la Reina de Hockey Hielo Femenino; the team had previously been Spanish Championship runners-up in 2019 and 2022. As Spanish Champions and winners of the Copa de la Reina, the Txuri Urdin women's team earned a place in the 2023 tournament of the EWHL Super Cup.

Achievements

Men's team
Liga Nacional de Hockey Hielo
Spanish Champions (12): 1976, 1980, 1985, 1990, 1992, 1993, 1995, 1999, 2000, 2017, 2018, 2019
Runners up (7): 1978, 1979, 1991, 1994, 2005, 2016, 2020

Copa del Rey de Hockey Hielo Copa del Rey champions (8): 1979, 1980, 1990, 1991, 1994, 2000, 2016, 2018

Euskal Herriko Kopa
 Champions (1) 1993

Women's team
Liga Nacional de Hockey Hielo Femenino
 Spanish Champions (1): 2022
 Runners-up (2): 2019, 2021

Copa de la Reina de Hockey Hielo Femenino
 Copa de la Reina champions' (1)'': 2022

References

External links
   
 Spanish ice hockey news 

Ice hockey teams in the Basque Country
Sports teams in San Sebastián
1972 establishments in Spain
Ice hockey clubs established in 1972